Geoffrey Reeve (1932–2010) was a British film director and producer. After graduating at Oxford with a degree in law, he moved to Canada. There he got a job at Imperial Chemical Industries, making promotional films for the company.

Credits

Producer
The Far Pavilions (1984, TV, 1 episode)
The Shooting Party (1985)

Director
Puppet on a Chain (1971)
Caravan to Vaccares (1974)
Souvenir (1989)
The Way to Dusty Death (1995, TV film)

Producer and Director
Shadow Run (1998)

Notes

External links
 

1932 births
2010 deaths
British film directors
British film producers